Anathallis linearifolia is a species of orchid.

References

External links 

linearifolia
Taxa named by Alfred Cogniaux